Soongsil University College of Law is part of Soongsil University (SSU),  a private Christian university in South Korea. The campus is located in 511 Sangdo-dong, Dongjak-gu, Seoul.

From its earliest days in the late 1800s, the University has offered instruction in law. Soongsil University is similar to many colleges and universities in South Korea in that it was founded by early Christian missionaries. The University was founded on October 10, 1897 in Pyongyang as a private school by Dr. William M. Baird, a missionary of the Northern Presbyterian Church of America. In 1900 the school was developed into an official 4-year junior high school. In October 1901 the school was named Soongsil Hakdang (숭실학당, "Soongsil Academy").  In 1905 the Hakdang was permitted by the missionary body to establish a college, called Union Christian College.  Law is part of the curriculum from the very beginning.  Early law classes included “Civil Law”, “Debate and Argument”, and “Rhetoric”.

In April 1954 Soongsil College was reestablished in South Korea. The Department of Law was one of the original four colleges that constituted the reborn college. In June 1957, Soongsil moved to its present-day Sangdo-dong Campus. In 1971 the College merged with Daejun College (대전대학 (大田大學) (not to be confused with present-day Daejeon University) into Soongjun College (숭전대학 (崇田大學)).

In December 1971 the College acquired a university status. In 1972, Soongsil's College of Law opened its graduate school program, offering LL.M.s and Ph.D.s.

In December 1982, Daejeon Campus of Soongjun University was separated and renamed Hannam University. In 1984, the Department of Law was officially promoted to the College of Law.

In November 1986, Soongjun University was renamed Soongsil University.

In 2010, the College of Law announces the new Department of Global Law.  The new degree, the LL.B. in Global Law, is one of the first programs in South Korea to offer education in the Anglo-American tradition of common law to undergraduate students. There are other common law programs in South Korea, such as at Handong University, but they are post-graduate programs.

Programs of Study 

The  College of Law offers multiple programs of study. It offers two undergraduate degrees, one an [(LL.B.)] in Global Law and the other a B.A. in Law (Korean). The College of Law also operates a graduate school program.  The graduate school offers a Masters in Law (Korean Law) and a [(LL.M.)] in American Law. Additionally, the graduate school offers a doctoral program for advanced students.

References 

See 숭실110년화보(110 Years of Soongsil: An Overview)

Law schools in South Korea
Soongsil University